Gonchary is a rural locality (a khutor) in Miusovskoye Rural Settlement, Danilovsky District, Volgograd Oblast, Russia. The population was 146 as of 2010. There are 5 streets.

Geography 
The village is located in steppe, 10 km from Miusovo, 18 km from Danilovka and 250 km from Volgograd.

References 

Rural localities in Danilovsky District, Volgograd Oblast